The Nairobi Technical Training Institute (NTTI) is a technical and vocational education and  training institute in Kenya. As of October 2016, it is one of the many accredited TVET centers in the country. Unlike the Kenyan universities that is supervised by the Commission for University Education, technical and vocational institutions receive accreditation from the Technical and Vocational Education and Training Authority of Kenya.

Location 
The institute currently has one learning center that serves as the main campus. It is located in  Nairobi. Nairobi Technical Training Institute is located at Ngara Area along Mogira Road, off Park Road and Ring Road, between Kariokor and Pangani Police Station.

History 
Nairobi Technical Training Institute derives its history as far back as the year 1951 when it started as “Modern High School” catering predominantly for the Asian community resident in the neighborhood. Though a secondary school, the curriculum offered at the time had a bias towards the inculcation of vocational skills which encompassed Mechanical Engineering and Carpentry & Joinery. In 1953, the name of the school was changed to Technical High School and the Cambridge School Certificate Examination was first taken in 1954.

Academics 
Nairobi Technical Training Institute offers courses on full-time, part-time and evening basis. Courses are categorized into Certificate, Diploma and Higher Diploma. The institute courses covers a wide range of fields including Mechanics and Mechanical Engineering, Electronics and Electrical Engineering, Institutional Management, Business Studies, Health and Applied Sciences. Some of  the courses offered in NIIT are listed below.

See also 
 List of universities and colleges in Kenya

References 
 Nairobi Technical Training Institute
 Google Maps by Google -  Location of the Nairobi Technical Training Institute: Locate NTTI
 Nairobi Technical Training Institute (NTTI): Courses, Campuses and Contacts

External links 
 Nairobi Technical Training Institute Website
 Google Maps by Google: Location of Nairobi Technical Training Institute
 Course Kenya: Nairobi Technical Training Institute Courses, Campuses and Contacts

Universities and colleges in Kenya